Zeuxidia aurelius, the giant Saturn, is a species of butterfly of the family Nymphalidae. It is found in Sumatra, Peninsular Malaysia and Borneo.

The wingspan is about 145 mm.

Subspecies
Zeuxidia aurelius aurelius (Sumatra, Peninsular Malaya)
Zeuxidia aurelius aureliana (south-eastern Borneo)  
Zeuxidia aurelius euthycrite (northern Borneo)

References

Butterflies of Borneo
Butterflies of Indochina
Zeuxidia